The 1967 United Nations Security Council election was held on 6 November 1967 during the Twenty-second session of the United Nations General Assembly, held at United Nations Headquarters in New York City. The General Assembly elected Algeria, Hungary, Pakistan, Paraguay, and Senegal, as the five new non-permanent members of the UN Security Council for two-year mandates commencing on 1 January 1968. Algeria and Senegal saw their first election into the council.

Rules
The Security Council has 15 seats, filled by five permanent members and ten non-permanent members. Each year, half of the non-permanent members are elected for two-year terms. A sitting member may not immediately run for re-election.

In accordance with the rules whereby the ten non-permanent UNSC seats rotate among the various regional blocs into which UN member states traditionally divide themselves for voting and representation purposes, the five available seats are allocated as follows:

Two for African countries, one of which being the "Arab Swing Seat" (held by Mali and Nigeria)
One for the Asian Group (now the Asia-Pacific Group) (held by Japan)
One for Latin America and the Caribbean (held by Argentina)
One for the Eastern European Group (held by Bulgaria)

To be elected, a candidate must receive a two-thirds majority of those present and voting. If the vote is inconclusive after the first round, three rounds of restricted voting shall take place, followed by three rounds of unrestricted voting, and so on, until a result has been obtained. In restricted voting, only official candidates may be voted on, while in unrestricted voting, any member of the given regional group, with the exception of current Council members, may be voted on.

Result
The election was managed by the then-President of the United Nations General Assembly Corneliu Mănescu of Romania. At this date the UN had 122 member states (for a timeline of UN membership, see Enlargement of the United Nations). Delegates of the member states were to write the names of the five countries they wished to elect on the ballot papers. There were no nominations prior to the election. Voting was conducted by secret ballot, and on a single ballot. 118 ballot papers were used.

Source:

See also
List of members of the United Nations Security Council
Pakistan and the United Nations

References

External links
UN Document A/59/881 Note Verbale from the Permanent Mission of Costa Rica containing a record of Security Council elections up to 2004

1967 elections
1967
Non-partisan elections
1967 in international relations
1967 in New York City
Security Council election